The mountain pocket gopher (Thomomys monticola) is a species of rodent in the family Geomyidae. It is endemic to California and Nevada.  The Sierra Nevada are part of its range.

References

Mountain pocket gopher
Mountain pocket gopher
Mammals of the United States
Rodents of North America
Mountain pocket gopher
Mountain pocket gopher
Mountain pocket gopher
Taxonomy articles created by Polbot